AT-121 is an experimental analgesic.  It was designed to be bifunctional, acting as an agonist at both the μ-opioid receptor and the nociceptin receptor.  The interaction with the nociceptin receptor is expected to block the abuse and dependence-related side effects that are typical of opioids.  A study in nonhuman primates found that AT-121 has morphine-like analgesic effects, but suppressed the addictive effects.

See also 
 AT-076
 Cebranopadol
 Oliceridine
 PZM21

References 

Mu-opioid receptor agonists
Nociceptin receptor agonists
Sulfamides
4-Phenylpiperidines
Experimental drugs
Tetrahydroisoquinolines